Iríni Terzóglou (born February 2, 1979, in Serres, Kentriki Makedonia) is a Greek shot putter. Her personal best put is 19.10 metres, achieved in June 2003 in Trikala. This is the current Greek record.

Achievements

References

External links
 
 

1979 births
Living people
Greek female shot putters
Athletes (track and field) at the 2004 Summer Olympics
Athletes (track and field) at the 2008 Summer Olympics
Olympic athletes of Greece
Sportspeople from Serres
Mediterranean Games silver medalists for Greece
Mediterranean Games medalists in athletics
Athletes (track and field) at the 2001 Mediterranean Games
Athletes (track and field) at the 2009 Mediterranean Games